Priort station is a railway station in Priort, district of the municipality Wustermark located in the Havelland district, Brandenburg, Germany.

The pedestrian bridge in the middle of the station was demolished on 13 November 2011.

References

Railway stations in Brandenburg
Railway stations in Germany opened in 1902
1902 establishments in Prussia
Buildings and structures in Havelland (district)